The men's javelin throw event at the 2000 Asian Athletics Championships was held in Jakarta, Indonesia on 30 August.

Results

References

2000 Asian Athletics Championships
Javelin throw at the Asian Athletics Championships